The Ogun State House of Assembly is the legislative branch of the Ogun State Government, Nigeria, inaugurated on February 3, 1979.
The assembly is unicameral with 26 representatives elected from each constituencies of the 20 local government area of the state.

Presently, the Assembly consists of 25 members of the All Progressive Congress and 1 member of the People's Democratic Party.

Presiding officer
The incumbent Speaker is Olakunle Oluomo, who was elected on June 10, 2019.

References

1976 establishments in Nigeria